Donald William McKellar (6 July 1884 – 19 January 1938) was an Australian rules footballer who played with Melbourne in the Victorian Football League (VFL).

Notes

External links 

 

1884 births
1938 deaths
Australian rules footballers from Victoria (Australia)
Melbourne Football Club players
People educated at Wesley College (Victoria)